Brownsville is an unincorporated community and census-designated place in Ouachita Parish, Louisiana, United States. Its population was 4,317 as of the 2010 census.

Geography

Prior to 2010, the Census Bureau included both Brownsville and Bawcomville in the Brownsville-Bawcomville census-designated place for statistical purposes.

Demographics

2020 census

As of the 2020 United States census, there were 4,353 people, 1,667 households, and 834 families residing in the CDP.

References

Unincorporated communities in Ouachita Parish, Louisiana
Unincorporated communities in Louisiana
Census-designated places in Ouachita Parish, Louisiana
Census-designated places in Louisiana